The Dark Mirror is a 1920 American silent horror-drama film and horror film directed by Charles Giblyn and written by E. Magnus Ingleton, based upon the story of the same name by Louis Joseph Vance. The film stars Dorothy Dalton in a dual role, Huntley Gordon, Walter D. Nealand, Jessie Arnold, Lucille Carney, Pedro de Cordoba, and Donald MacPherson. The film was released on May 9, 1920, by Paramount Pictures. It is listed as Jericho in some film reference guides. The film survives.

Plot
As described in a film magazine, New York society member Priscilla Maine (Dalton) is troubled by strange dreams in which she vividly sees members of the underworld involved in a murder. She confides this to her admirer, Dr. Philip Fosdick (Gordon), who undertakes to solve the mystery. As if to make her dreams come true, a gang of thugs mistakes her for Nora, a belle of the Bowery, and kidnaps her. Nora (Dalton) is known to be gangster Red Carnahan's (Nealand) girl, but is loved by the Spaniard, Mario Gonzales (de Cordoba). Mario rescues Nora from Red's clutches, marries her, and brings her to New Jersey. Red and his gang search for them, and when Red discovers the real Nora, he drowns her. Priscilla is rescued by Mario, who thinks she is his wife Nora, not realizing that Nora has been murdered. Dr. Fosdick is attempting to explain the true circumstances to Mario at his New Jersey retreat when Priscilla looks out the window and sees Red Carnahan on the shore of a nearby lake. She rushes out just as Red is drawing a woman's dead body from the water. Red is horrified to see Priscilla, an exact counterpart of the dead Nora, and drowns himself in superstitious terror. It turns out that Priscilla's father had married a gypsy woman with whom he had two twin daughters, Nora and Priscilla, and Nora was taken away by the gypsy when she ran away one day. The mystery resolved, Priscilla consents to wed Dr. Fosdick.

Cast
Dorothy Dalton as Priscilla Maine / Nora O'Moore
Huntley Gordon as Dr. Philip Fosdick
Walter D. Nealand as Red Carnahan 
Jessie Arnold as Inez
Lucille Carney as Addy 
Pedro de Cordoba as Mario Gonzales
Donald MacPherson as The Nut
Bert Starkey as Charlie the Coke

References

External links 

Silent American drama films
Silent horror drama films
American horror drama films
1920 films
1920s English-language films
1920 drama films
1920s horror drama films
Paramount Pictures films
Films directed by Charles Giblyn
American black-and-white films
American silent feature films
1920s American films